Weston Island is an uninhabited island in James Bay and is part of Qikiqtaaluk Region, Nunavut, Canada. It is lies between South Twin Island and Trodely Island.

Islands of James Bay
Uninhabited islands of Qikiqtaaluk Region